Aaron Ogden (December 3, 1756April 19, 1839) was an American soldier, lawyer, United States Senator and the fifth governor of New Jersey.  Ogden is perhaps best known today as the complainant in Gibbons v. Ogden which destroyed the monopoly power of steamboats on the Hudson River in 1824.

Early life
Ogden was born in Elizabethtown (known today as "Elizabeth") in the Province of New Jersey.  He was the son of Robert Ogden, a lawyer and public official who served as Speaker of the New Jersey lower house immediately preceding the Revolution, and Phebe (née Hatfield) Ogden.  Ogden's brother Matthias Ogden (1754–1791) was a Revolutionary War soldier and his nephew, Daniel Haines, also served as Governor of New Jersey on two separate occasions.

Ogden, a Presbyterian, graduated from the College of New Jersey (now Princeton University) in 1773, and served as a grammar school tutor from 1773 to 1775.

Career
In the American Revolutionary War, Ogden was appointed a lieutenant in the 1st New Jersey Regiment; his older brother Matthias Ogden was the lieutenant colonel. Aaron Ogden served in various roles through the war, seeing action and rising to the rank of brigade major.  In 1778, he visited the house occupied by the family of diarist Sally Wister, who described him as "a genteel young fellow, with an aquiline nose."  Ogden was wounded at the siege of Yorktown in 1781.

Ogden was admitted as an original member of The Society of the Cincinnati in the state of New Jersey when it was established in 1783. He went on to serve as the President of the New Jersey Society from 1824 until his death in 1839, and President General of The Society of the Cincinnati from 1829 until his death.

Political career
After the war, Ogden studied law and was admitted to the bar in 1784. He commenced practice in Elizabeth and served as a presidential elector in the 1796 electoral college that elected John Adams.  He was clerk of Essex County from 1785 to 1803, and was elected as a Federalist to the United States Senate to fill the vacancy caused by the resignation of James Schureman and served from February 28, 1801 to March 3, 1803. He lost his bid for re-election to the Senate in 1802.

In 1803, Ogden was elected to the New Jersey General Assembly, where he served until 1812. Ogden was elected trustee of the College of New Jersey (later to become Princeton University) in 1803, a post in which he served until his death.

In 1812, Ogden was elected as Governor of New Jersey in a wave of Federalist victories across the state due to opposition to the War of 1812.   Ogden had been nominated by his Federalist colleagues as governor many times before, but the Republicans held the majority in the Assembly and elected their choice from 1803 to 1812.  During his term as governor, "funds were secured for the military's use in the war against Britain."  After running unsuccessfully for re-election, the Federalists lost their majority in the Assembly and Ogden retired from political life. Ogden was nominated by President James Madison as major general of the Army in 1813, but declined the appointment.

Steamboat operations
In 1811, he became engaged in steamboat navigation by building the steamboat Sea Horse to run between Elizabeth and New York City.  In 1812, in Livingston v. Van Ingen, the courts chose to upheld a steamboat monopoly over the Hudson River.  In 1813, the New York State Legislature further upheld the monopoly created by Chancellor Robert Livingston and Robert Fulton, who had designed the steamboat. In response, Ogden agreed to pay them for a ten-year monopoly to run his line.

As a result of a feud with his neighbor and competing steamboat operator who violated the statutory monopoly, Thomas Gibbons, Ogden filed the complaint in Gibbons v. Ogden, seeking to enjoin Gibbons from operating a steamboat on New York waters.  As a result, the United States Supreme Court declared unconstitutional New York's attempted monopoly on steamboat operation between New York and New Jersey based on the Commerce Clause. In the case, decided by the U.S. Supreme Court in 1824, Ogden was represented by Samuel L. Southard and Joseph Hopkinson, while Livingston was represented by Thomas Addis Emmet, and Gibbons by Daniel Webster and U.S. Attorney General William Wirt.

Later life
Ogden moved to Jersey City in 1829 and resumed the practice of law.  It was in Jersey City where he was arrested for debt and sent to a debtors' prison. He was released several months later under an act of the Legislature that provided "that no Revolutionary officer or soldier should be imprisoned for debt.  The law was so framed as to cover the case of Col. Ogden, and he was released."  In 1830, he was appointed as Collector of Customs of Jersey City, an office created specifically for him by an act of Congress, and served until his death in Jersey City.

Personal life

Ogden was married to Elizabeth Chetwood (1766–1826), the daughter of John Chetwood, an attorney, and Mary (née Emott) Chetwood (d. 1786). She was the older sister of U.S. Representative and Mayor of Elizabeth William Chetwood (1771–1857). Together, they were the parents of:

 Mary Chetwood Ogden (1789–1863), who was married to George Clinton Barber.
 Phebe Ann Ogden (1790–1865), who served as Vice Regent of the Mount Vernon Ladies' Association.
 Matthias Ogden (1792–1860), who married Lucille Robert.
 John Robert Ogden (1794–1845).
 Elias Bailey Dayton Ogden (1797–1799), who died young.
 Elias Bailey Dayton Ogden (1800–1865), who was named after his deceased brother. Elias, who married three times, served as an associate justice of the New Jersey Supreme Court from 1842 until his death in 1865.
 Aaron Ogden Jr. (1803–1803), who died young.

Ogden died in Jersey City, New Jersey on April 19, 1839.  Ogden's body is interred at the burial ground of the First Presbyterian Church of Elizabeth.

He was a slaveholder.

Descendants
Through his son Elias, he was the grandfather of Frederick Beasley Ogden (1827–1893), who served as Mayor of Hoboken, New Jersey from 1865 to 1867; Aaron Ogden (1828–1896), who married Harriet Emily Travers; and Susan Dayton Ogden (1831–1878), who married William Shepard Biddle, and were the parents of U.S. Army general John Biddle.

See also
List of governors of New Jersey
Gibbons v. Ogden

References
Notes

Sources
 Baxter, Maurice G. Dictionary of American Biography
The Steamboat Monopoly: Gibbons v. Ogden, 1824. New York: Alfred A. Knopf, 1972.
 Ogden, Aaron. Autobiography of Col. Aaron Ogden, of Elizabethtown. Paterson, NJ: Press Printing & Publishing Co., 1893.
 Purcell, L. Edward. Who Was Who in the American Revolution. New York: Facts on File, 1993. .

External links
 Retrieved on 2009-02-26
Biography of Aaron Ogden (PDF), New Jersey State Library
New Jersey Governor Aaron Ogden, National Governors Association
Dead Governors of New Jersey bio for Aaron Ogden
 The Society of the Cincinnati
 American Revolution Institute

|-

1756 births
1839 deaths
Politicians from Elizabeth, New Jersey
People of colonial New Jersey
American people of English descent
American Presbyterians
Federalist Party United States senators from New Jersey
Governors of New Jersey
Federalist Party state governors of the United States
New Jersey Federalists
Members of the New Jersey General Assembly
Princeton University alumni
Continental Army officers from New Jersey
Burials in New Jersey
19th-century American politicians